Rabbi Yitzchok Tuvia Weiss (26 August 1926 – 29 July 2022) was the Chief Rabbi, or Gaavad (Gaon Av Beis Din), of Jerusalem for the Edah HaChareidis. He was appointed to this post in 2004, after having served as a dayan of the Machzike Hadass community of Antwerp, Belgium. Rabbi Weiss was a British national.

According to his late brother, he was born in Pezinok, Slovakia as Tibor Weiss to Salomon (Shlomo) Weiss, a timber merchant. He attended the local secular school in the mornings, and took religious instruction with a private melamed in the afternoons.

Before World War II, he escaped Slovakia on a Kindertransport, arranged by Aron Grünhut and Sir Nicholas Winton, leaving his parents and family behind. He arrived with the Kindertransport in London in late May 1939, after the Jewish holiday of Shavuos. He celebrated the Shabbos of his bar mitzvah at the home of a British woman who took him in. The only religious text he received for his bar mitzvah was a copy of the Kitzur Shulchan Aruch, which he studied for many weeks until he mastered it. He also received a pair of tefillin, sent to him from his father through the Red Cross before he was murdered. By the time the tefillin arrived, neither of his parents were alive. The Sassover Rebbe Rabbi Simcha Rubin of London became his Rebbe and then was adopted by the Rebbe.

Rabbi Weiss continued his education at Yeshivas Toras Emes in Stamford Hill, London (also known as Schneider's Yeshiva), where he studied under Rabbi Moshe (Yehuda) Schneider. One of his peers at the Yeshiva was Rabbi Moishe Sternbuch, who served alongside him as the Raavad (Rosh Av Beis Din) of Jerusalem. After his marriage, he studied at the Gateshead Kollel under Rabbi Eliyahu Eliezer Dessler, who served as rosh kollel. After Rabbi Dessler moved to Israel in the late 1940s, Rabbi Weiss was appointed to serve as one of the executives of the Gateshead Kollel.

A few years later, Rabbi Weiss moved to London, where he was hired as a maggid shiur at Yeshiva Horomo, lead by Rabbi Elyokim Schlesinger, and as rav of the Tzeirei Agudas Yisroel shul (known as "Upstairs 69"). Later, he moved to Antwerp, where he served as a maggid shiur at a yeshiva in Wilrijk, and where he was appointed dayan in 1967. He also served, in an unofficial capacity, as the Rav of the Gerrer Shtiebel, and the Yingerleit Shul in Antwerp.

When he accepted his new role as Gaavad in 2004, he also adopted the traditional Jerusalem mode of dress.

In 2019, a collection of Rabbi Weiss' novellae on the books of Genesis and Exodus was published, titled Shaarei Tuviah.

Rabbi Weiss died on 30 July 2022, at the age of 95.

Edah HaHaredis 
Rabbi Weiss became the head of the ultra-orthodox group known at 'Edah HaHaredis,' (Eda Haredit—modern Hebrew) in 2004. When the Israeli government first came out with certain restrictions on citizens to protect the country from the worst results of the coronavirus pandemic, such as limiting prayer quorums and other large gatherings of people, Rabbi Weiss opposed those decisions, but retracted soon after. On 2 April 2020 the Rabbi was diagnosed with COVID-19 after having been already admitted to Jerusalem's Hadassah Ein Kerem Hospital on the previous day with high fever and low blood pressure. A few days later, on 5 April, the Rabbi was released from the hospital after his condition improved, to remain in isolation while continuing to recover.

References

Further reading
 

1926 births
2022 deaths
Haredi rabbis in Israel
Rabbis of the Edah HaChareidis
Belgian Orthodox rabbis
English Orthodox rabbis
British expatriates in Israel
Kindertransport refugees
Rabbis in Jerusalem
Anti-Zionist Haredi rabbis
Judaism in Antwerp
British people of Slovak-Jewish descent
Czechoslovak emigrants to England
Naturalised citizens of the United Kingdom
Slovak emigrants to the United Kingdom